Mount Prior is a mountain (1,220 m) about 10 nautical miles (18 km) west of Mount Brewster, rising at the head of Whitehall Glacier in the west part of Daniell Peninsula, Victoria Land. Named by New Zealand Geological Survey Antarctic Expedition (NZGSAE), 1957–58, for George T. Prior of the Mineral Department, British Museum, who studied and analyzed the rocks obtained from this region by the Discovery expedition, 1901–04.

Mountains of Victoria Land
Borchgrevink Coast